Auckland Libraries is the public library system for the Auckland Region of New Zealand. It was created when the seven separate councils in the Auckland region merged in 2010. It is currently the largest public-library network in the Southern Hemisphere with 55 branches from Wellsford to Waiuku. Currently from March 2021, the region has a total of 56 branches.

History
In November 2010, Auckland's local councils merged to create the Auckland Council. As a result of this process, the seven public library systems within the region were combined to form Auckland Libraries.

The following library networks were amalgamated, forming Auckland Libraries:
 Auckland City Libraries
 Bookinopolis (in the Franklin District)
 Manukau Libraries
 North Shore Libraries
 Papakura Library ServicesThe Sir Edmund Hillary Library
 Rodney Libraries
 Waitakere Libraries

The process of amalgamation

In the years leading up to the merger of the library systems within Auckland, the separate library systems combined to form a consortium in order to align their processes. This organisation was called eLGAR ("Libraries for a Greater Auckland Region"). This consortium settled on Millenium as their Library Management System, and the libraries within this system all moved to this software. The result was that the library systems were able to offer their customers a seamless transition to membership of the larger network, with immediate access to all 55 libraries from November 1, 2010 (the first day of the new council). As of April 2021, there are more than 56 libraries across Auckland region (one of which is Takaanini Library, which opened on 27 March).

Auckland City Libraries

Prior to amalgamation, Auckland City Libraries was a network of 17 public libraries and a mobile library operated by Auckland City Council.

In September 1880, Auckland City Council took responsibility for the library of the Auckland Mechanics' Institute which had come under financial difficulties. The Mechanics’ Institute was formed in 1842 and the items remaining in its library, along with items from the Library of the old Auckland Provincial Council (1853–1876), were included in the collection of the Auckland Free Public Library. In 1887, George Grey donated around 8,000 books, doubling the existing collection, and a new building was erected for the library on the corner of Wellesley and Coburg (now Kitchener) streets. At the time, this building housed the entire collection for the Auckland public library, in addition to the city's art collection. Additionally, from its inception in 1916 until it was closed in 1957, The Old Colonists’ Museum was also in this building. This building is now the Auckland Art Gallery.

The building on Lorne Street that currently houses the Central City library was opened in 1971.

"Bookinopolis"

Before amalgamation, three public libraries—Pukekohe, Waiuku and Tuakau—made up a network known as "Bookinopolis". A municipal library had first been established at Pukekohe in 1913 and at Waiuku in 1946, in each case taking over an existing subscription library. Tuakau Public Library was opened in 1977. After local-body amalgamation in 1989, these three libraries formed the Franklin District library system. In 2000, this was taken over by the Franklin District Library Trust (from 2009 the Franklin Arts, Culture & Library Trust). The Trust renamed its library system "Bookinopolis". In 2010, the Pukekohe and Waiuku libraries became branches of Auckland Libraries, but, due to boundary changes, Tuakau was taken over by Waikato District Council.

Manukau Libraries

When Manukau City Council was formed by the amalgamation of Manukau County and Manurewa Borough in 1965, it took over responsibility for a small subscription library at Māngere East and volunteer-run community libraries in Alfriston, Beachlands, Clevedon, Kawakawa Bay, Maraetai, Orere Point and Weymouth. The newly formed city opened its first full-service public library at Manurewa in 1967. This was followed by children's libraries at both Otara and Mangere East in 1969, branch libraries at Pakuranga in 1973 and Manukau City Centre in 1976, and a combined school and public library at Ngā Tapuwae College in 1978. Then came Māngere Bridge in 1979, Māngere Town Centre (which replaced Ngā Tapuwae) in 1980 and Highland Park in 1987.

Local-body amalgamation in 1989 saw two more libraries added to the system: Papatoetoe and Howick, where the municipal library services dated from 1945 and 1947 respectively. In 1958 Papatoetoe Library had earned the distinction of setting up the first municipal mobile library in New Zealand.

Manukau Libraries’ last three branches were Clendon (1995), the innovative Tupu-Dawson Road Youth Library (2001), and the Botany Idealibrary (2004). Clendon Library was renamed Te Matariki Clendon when it was relocated in 2006. Throughout its life, Manukau Libraries operated as a dispersed rather than a centralised library system. However, in 2001 it also opened a reference and reading room near Manukau City Centre that later expanded into the Manukau Research Library. By 2010 Manukau Libraries operated 13 branch libraries, a research library, five volunteer-run 'rural libraries', and a mobile library.

North Shore Libraries

In 1989, the North Shore City Council was formed by combining the various boroughs that had previously existed on the North Shore, so that prior to the 2010 amalgamation of the council into the Auckland Council, North Shore Libraries was a network of six libraries and a mobile library.

Waitakere Libraries

Waitakere Libraries was part of Waitakere City Council services. Prior to the 2010 amalgamation of the Auckland Council, Waitakere Libraries consisted of Waitakere Central Library at Henderson, New Lynn War Memorial Library, Te Atatu Peninsula Library, Massey Library, Ranui Library, Glen Eden Library, and Titirangi Library.

Collections and branches

Membership of Auckland Libraries is free for residents and ratepayers of the Auckland Council region. Auckland Libraries has free lending collections and a small number of rental collections (DVDs and music CDs). Library members can request an item from any of the libraries in Auckland Libraries for free. On 1 September 2021 Auckland Libraries went fines free and removed all existing overdue fines from patron records.

Many of the libraries provide Internet access. The library system also gives access to three specialised eBook suppliers: Overdrive, BorrowBox (run by Bolinda Audio), and Wheelers. There is also a Digital Library which includes over 100 databases. The library system also provides a number of free events: Wriggle and Rhyme: Active Movement for Early Learning for babies; storytime for toddlers; book clubs for teens and adults; guest speakers and author talks; movie nights; school-holiday programmes, and computer classes.

Branches

Heritage collections and Research Centres 
Auckland Libraries has an online database recording its heritage collections holdings. The online database is named Kura Heritage Collections Online and includes photographs, maps, manuscripts, journals, indexes and oral histories.

Research Centres
In addition to the lending and rental collections Auckland Libraries also holds a number of heritage and research collections. These are primarily held in the four regional Research Centres and the Auckland Libraries Heritage Collections including Sir George Grey Special Collections.

The North Auckland Research Centre is home to heritage collections such as the Angela Morton Art History Collection and the letters of Major Donald Stott. The Angela Morton Collection is a reference collection of publications which relate to the visual art and artists of New Zealand.

The Central Auckland Research Centre holds microfilms of Auckland heritage newspapers, copies of Auckland area local newspapers and the Auckland Star Clippings collection as well as a comprehensive collection of Māori, Family History and Local History published material.

The South Auckland Research Centre, based at Manukau City Centre, specialises in the history of the southern and eastern parts of Auckland city (Howick, Manukau, Manurewa-Papakura and Franklin wards), but also has strong general reference, family history, Māori and New Zealand collections. The heritage collections include a wide range of books and periodicals, newspapers, photographs, maps, oral history recordings, ephemera, and manuscripts and archives.

Further south, Pukekohe Library also holds substantial heritage collections of books, photographs, periodicals and newspapers relating to the Franklin area. South Auckland Research Centre staff work closely with local historical societies and museums in the area which have heritage collections.

The West Auckland Research Centre moved into the former Waitākere Central Library Reference Room in April 2013. The Local History collections includes collections of John Thomas (Jack) Diamond, who researched and collected material on the history and industries of the West Auckland region. His personal papers and research library were donated to the library in 2001. The collection contains material on Maori and the archaeology of the Waitākere Ranges and the brick, pottery and timber industries. It also includes approximately 10,000 photographs, both prints and negatives. The collection also includes published and unpublished material on the heritage of West Auckland, and includes books, magazines, newspapers, research files, ephemera, photographs, personal papers, community archives and over 200 oral histories.

Images, audio, collection records and indexes held in Auckland Libraries’ Heritage and Research collections are available online at Kura Heritage Collections Online.

Sir George Grey Special Collections

Sir George Grey Special Collections: Tā Hori Kerei – Ngā kohinga taonga whakahirahira is the most prominent among Auckland Libraries heritage collections. Since the founding gift to the citizens of Auckland by George Grey in 1887, the collections have grown by purchase and generous donations by numerous benefactors to become one of the country's major heritage collections.

Significant holdings include two items of documentary heritage that are part of the UNESCO Memory of the World, New Zealand register: God Defend New Zealand and the Grey Māori Manuscripts. Other items of note include the first work printed in New Zealand: Ko te katihama III (pictured), printed in 1830 by William Yate who worked for the Church Missionary Society; the manuscript of Robin Hyde’s unpublished autobiography and of Baron de Thierry’s Historical narrative of an attempt to form a settlement in New Zealand; a certified copy written in Māori of the Treaty of Waitangi, and documents concerning the building of the Stone Store at Kerikeri, New Zealand’s oldest surviving stone building.

Archival collections that have been deposited include the personal papers of Jane Mander and John A. Lee, as well as the records of Mercury Theatre and the Auckland branch of Greenpeace Aotearoa New Zealand.  Significant photograph collections include those of Clifton Firth and Henry Winkelmann. On his retirement in 1974, Firth gave Auckland Libraries much of his surviving work, including many display prints as well as more than 100 000 photographic negatives. The Old Colonists’ Museum purchased a large collection of Winkelmann's Auckland images from the photographer himself in 1928. These were transferred to the library after the museum's closure in 1957.

Notable international rare books include a copy of Shakespeare's First Folio (1623), Spenser's The Faerie Queene (1590); an edition of William Blake’s Europe a Prophecy and America a Prophecy bound together, and Alexander Shaw’s A catalogue of the different specimens of cloth collected in the three voyages of Captain Cook (known as "the tapa-cloth book"). 
The Reed Dumas collection resides in Sir George Grey Special Collections. From boyhood an avid admirer of French author Alexandre Dumas, Whangarei pharmacist Frank Reed (1854–1953) gradually accumulated the most extensive Dumas collection outside France—and then bequeathed the more than 4,000 items to Auckland Public Library. It includes 500 first editions in French and English, 2,000 sheets of original manuscripts, and 51 typescript volumes of translations, letters and bibliographies.

Further reading

References

External links

Real Gold, Treasures of Auckland City Libraries online version of the exhibition that accompanied the book
Kura Heritage Collections Online

Libraries in Auckland
Special collections libraries